Maha Thray Sithu James Barrington was a Burmese diplomat.

Life
 In September 1936 appointed to the Indian Civil Service (British India).
Up to 1942 he served as administrative officer in the district.
On independence of Burma he was appointed Permanent Secretary of the Foreign Office (Myanmar). 
From 1950 to 1955 he was ambassador in Washington, D.C. and concurrently Permanent Representative next the Headquarters of the United Nations.
In April 1956 he was reappointed Permanent Secretary, Foreign Office (Myanmar). 
In May 1961 he became member of the delegation, Geneva Conference on Laos.
From February 11, 1963 to January 16, 1970 he was Ambassador in Ottawa.

References

1911 births
1992 deaths
Ambassadors of Myanmar to the United States
Ambassadors of Myanmar to Canada
Permanent Representatives of Myanmar to the United Nations